Chelyabinsk Tractor Plant (abbreviated) also known as CTZ-Uraltrak (ЧТЗ-УРАЛТРАК) is a tractor construction plant in the Russian city of Chelyabinsk.

History

The Chelyabinsk Tractor plant was a project of the first five-year plan. The plant was founded in 1933; the first product was a 60 hp tracked tractor C-60 (Сталинец-60, Stalinets-60) fueled by petroleum ether (Benzine). In 1937 the factory produced its first diesel-powered vehicle C-65 (Сталинец-65, Stalinets-65). By 1940 the plant had produced 100,000 tractors.

During World War II seven other industrial entities (including most of Leningrad's Kirov Plant and 15,000 of its workers) were either wholly or partially relocated to Chelyabinsk, the resulting enterprise commonly known as "Танкоград" ('Tankograd', or 'Tank City'). The work force increased to 60,000 workers by 1944, from 25,000 during non-military production; during the conflict the works produced 18,000 tanks, and 48,500 tank diesel engines as well as over 17 million units of ammunition. Production included the KV tank from 1941, T-34 tank from 1942, KV-85 tank and IS tanks from 1943, and T-34/85 tank and SU-85 self-propelled field gun from 1944 By 1945 the plant had been awarded the Order of Kutuzov, 1st Class, the Order of Lenin, the Order of the Red Star, and other honours for its efforts in helping to defeat Nazi Germany.

Post World War II conventional tractor production resumed with the С-80 (Сталинец-80, Stalinets-80) entering serial production in 1946. The plant reverted to its original name of Chelyabinsk Tractor factory in 1958. In 1961 a tractor with diesel electric transmission entered production: DET-250 (ДЭТ-250). The millionth tractor from CTZ was produced in 1984.

In 1990 a tractor with a hydromechanical transmission system entered production (T-10).

In 2008 the company acquired 100% of amphibious tracked machine building company "Vityaz" (Витязь); both are now part of the Uralvagonzavod holding group which Uraltrak established in association with other companies.

Operations and products

The organisation includes foundry and forging facilities, metal engineering facilities (CNC, lathes, heat treatment) as well as construction and assembly workshops.

As of 2011, Chelyabinsk Tractor Plant produces wheeled and tracked tractors and related modified vehicles, and related parts, as well as tractor engines up to ~.

Since 2010 the company has manufactured fork lifts under license from Bulgarian company Balkancar Record,

The company also produces road tanker vehicles, semi-trailers and pipe installation road vehicles.

By 8 May 2022, due to sanctions imposed after the 2022 Russian invasion of Ukraine, US officials claimed that Chelyabinsk Tractor Plant’s tank production had halted, had been made “idle,” due to a lack of imported parts. These claims have since been proven untrue.

Subsidiaries
Since 2008 Machine engineering company 'Vityaz' (Машиностроительная компания "Витязь") has been a subsidiary of CTZ-Uraltrak. The company produces the Vityaz line of tracked all-terrain vehicles with amphibious capabilities.

Historical products

See also
 Stalinets-60 – copy of Caterpillar Sixty
 S-65 Stalinets
 Omsktransmash – Russian wheeled tractor manufacturer
 Traktor Chelyabinsk – ice hockey team
 Soviet tank factories

Notes

References

External links

 Chelyabinsk Tractor Plant official site 
 Chelyabinsk Tractor Plant official site 
 JSC Machine-building Company «Vityaz» company website www.bolotohod.ru
 (abstract)
 Chelyabinsk Tractor Plant, Photographs, Albert Kahn Associates, 1930s, Canadian Centre for Architecture (digitized items)

Russian brands
Soviet brands
Manufacturing companies of the Soviet Union
Defence companies of the Soviet Union
Companies based in Chelyabinsk
Uralvagonzavod
Construction and civil engineering companies of Russia